Gene Branton (born November 23, 1960) is a former American football wide receiver. He played for the Tampa Bay Buccaneers in 1983 and 1985.

References

1960 births
Living people
American football wide receivers
Texas Southern Tigers football players
Tampa Bay Buccaneers players